Guo Lingling (born 18 August 1989 in Handan) is a Chinese Paralympic powerlifter. She won the gold medal in the women's 41 kg event at the 2020 Summer Paralympics held in Tokyo, Japan. She is also a three-time gold medalist at the World Para Powerlifting Championships.

Career 

She won the gold medal in the women's 45 kg event at both the 2017 World Para Powerlifting Championships and 2019 World Para Powerlifting Championships. She also won the gold medal in the women's 41 kg event at the 2021 World Para Powerlifting Championships.

In 2017, she set a new world record of 110 kg at the World Para Powerlifting Championships. At the 2018 World Para Powerlifting Asia-Oceania Open Championships, she improved this world record by lifting 114 kg. At the 2019 World Championships, she set a new world record in the women's 45 kg weight class by lifting 118 kg.

At the 2020 Summer Paralympics held in Tokyo, Japan, she won the gold medal in the women's 41 kg event and she set a new world record in this weight class by lifting 109 kg. A few months later, she won the gold medal in her event at the 2021 World Para Powerlifting Championships held in Tbilisi, Georgia. She also improved her world record to 109.5 kg.

Results

References

External links 
 

1989 births
Living people
Chinese powerlifters
Female powerlifters
Paralympic powerlifters of China
Paralympic gold medalists for China
Paralympic medalists in powerlifting
Powerlifters at the 2020 Summer Paralympics
Medalists at the 2020 Summer Paralympics
Sportspeople from Handan
21st-century Chinese women